Asmodeus is an  Austrian black metal band founded in 1996.

History 

Tyr and Desdemon began the band as a project called Diabolus. After the first permanent line up was assembled, the name was changed to Asmodeus.

In late 1998, Tyr (guitars), Desdemon (bass, vocals), Dargoth (guitars), and Harth (drums) recorded their first demo, Supreme Surrender.  Harth and Dargoth then left the band, and were replaced by Lestat (guitars) and Ashrak (drums).  After their first shows in Austria, Asmodeus recorded their second demo, As the Winter Moon Bleeds.

The group toured with bands including Satyricon, Behemoth, Hecate Enthroned and Rebaelliun, becoming more popular in the black metal underground. In November 2000, the third demo was recorded and released. Lestat then left the band, and Naroth joined permanently.

Phalanx Inferna, Asmodeus' first full-length album, was released via Twilight records. Due to the response to the album, Asmodeus were invited to perform at a variety of national and international concerts in 2004. In April 2005, the first tour through Europe took place with Belphegor, Arkhon Infaustus, and In Aeternum.  Naroth couldn't play the tour, and was replaced by Azazel. Following the completion of the tour, Ashrak left the band as well.  A long search for new permanent members began, and in October 2005, a new drummer, Malthus, was recruited.  Asmodeus recorded Imperium Damnatum with T.T. (Abigor) in December 2005 at Infinite Sounds Studios.

The new album Adamant was released in a special version as woodpak (CD case made of wood) at the Austrian label Talheim Records. A digipak, vinyl version and a few shows are planned.

Discography

Studio albums 
Phalanx Inferna (2003, Twilight Vertrieb)
Imperium Damnatum (2006, Twilight Vertrieb)
Adamant (2018, Talheim Records)

Demos 
Supreme Surrender (1998)
As the Winter Moon Bleeds (2000)
Embers of Aeon (2001)

Compilations 
Twilight Sampler (2006)

Lineup

Current members 
 Tyr - guitars (1996–present)
 Desdemona - bass, vocals (1996–present)
 Azalea - guitars (2006-2009, 2012–present; touring 2005-2006)
 Nordger - drums (2010–present)

Former members 
 Harth - drums (1996-1999)
 Dargoth - guitars (1996-1999)
 Ashram - drums (1999-2005)
 Lestat - guitars, backing vocals (1999-2002)
 Naroth - guitars (2002-2005)
 Malthus - drums (2005-2010)
 Garm - guitars (2010-2012)

Timeline

External links 
 

Austrian black metal musical groups
Musical groups established in 1996
Musical quartets